The signiferi of the Roman legions were the ranks entrusted with various tasks to do with standard-bearing. Early in the Roman Republic the single rank signifer performed all these tasks but later in the Empire the tasks became more specialist with different ranks created for specific tasks, including the aquilifer (eagle standard bearer for the whole legion), imaginifer (bearer of the portrait of the god-like Emperor), and the draconarius (bearer of a cavalry standard).

See also
Aquilifer
Signifer
Imaginifer
Vexillarius
Draconarius

References

Military ranks of ancient Rome
Ancient Roman titles